Muhammad Khan (4 July 1928 – 18 March 2013) was a Pakistani boxer. He competed in the men's middleweight event at the 1952 Summer Olympics.

References

1928 births
2013 deaths
Pakistani male boxers
Olympic boxers of Pakistan
Boxers at the 1952 Summer Olympics
Place of birth missing
Middleweight boxers